This is a list of butterflies of South Africa. Over 660 species are known from South Africa, a large proportion of which are endemic.

Family Nymphalidae

Subfamily Danainae

Amauris albimaculata
Amauris echeria
Amauris niavius
Amauris ochlea
Danaus chrysippus
Tirumala petiverana

Subfamily Satyrinae

Aeropetes tulbaghia
Bicyclus anynana
Bicyclus ena
Bicyclus safitza
Cassionympha camdeboo
Cassionympha cassius
Cassionympha detecta
Coenyra aurantiaca
Coenyra hebe
Coenyra rufiplaga
Coenyropsis natalii
Dingana alaedeus
Dingana alticola
Dingana angusta
Dingana bowkeri
Dingana clara
Dingana clarki
Dingana dingana
Dingana fraterna
Dingana jerinae
Dingana kammanassiensis
Dira clytus
Dira jansei
Dira oxylus
Dira swanepoeli
Gnophodes betsimena
Heteropsis perspicua
Melampias huebneri
Melanitis leda
Neita durbani
Neita extensa
Neita lotenia
Neita neita
Paralethe dendrophilus
Physcaeneura panda
Pseudonympha gaika
Pseudonympha hippia
Pseudonympha loxophthalma
Pseudonympha machacha
Pseudonympha magoides
Pseudonympha magus
Pseudonympha narycia
Pseudonympha paludis
Pseudonympha paragaika
Pseudonympha penningtoni
Pseudonympha poetula
Pseudonympha southeyi
Pseudonympha swanepoeli
Pseudonympha trimenii
Pseudonympha varii
Stygionympha curlei
Stygionympha dicksoni
Stygionympha geraldi
Stygionympha irrorata
Stygionympha robertsoni
Stygionympha scotina
Stygionympha vansoni
Stygionympha vigilans
Stygionympha wichgrafi
Tarsocera cassina
Tarsocera cassus
Tarsocera dicksoni
Tarsocera fulvina
Tarsocera imitator
Tarsocera namaquensis
Tarsocera southeyae
Torynesis hawequas
Torynesis magna
Torynesis mintha
Torynesis orangica
Torynesis pringlei
Ypthima antennata
Ypthima asterope
Ypthima condamini
Ypthima granulosa
Ypthima impura

Subfamily Heliconiinae

Acraea acara
Acraea acrita
Acraea aglaonice
Acraea anemosa
Acraea axina
Acraea barberi
Acraea boopis
Acraea caldarena
Acraea horta
Acraea lygus
Acraea machequena
Acraea natalica
Acraea neobule
Acraea nohara
Acraea oncaea
Acraea petraea
Acraea rabbaiae
Acraea satis
Acraea stenobea
Acraea trimeni
Acraea violarum
Bematistes aganice
Hyalites cerasa
Hyalites eponina
Hyalites obeira
Lachnoptera ayresii
Pardopsis punctatissima
Phalanta eurytis
Phalanta phalantha
Telchinia alalonga
Telchinia anacreon
Telchinia cabira
Telchinia encedon
Telchinia esebria
Telchinia igola
Telchinia induna
Telchinia rahira
Telchinia serena

Subfamily Charaxinae

Charaxes achaemenes
Charaxes bohemani
Charaxes brutus
Charaxes candiope
Charaxes castor
Charaxes cithaeron
Charaxes druceanus
Charaxes etesipe
Charaxes ethalion
Charaxes guderiana
Charaxes jahlusa
Charaxes jasius
Charaxes karkloof
Charaxes marieps
Charaxes pelias
Charaxes phaeus
Charaxes pondoensis
Charaxes protoclea
Charaxes vansoni
Charaxes varanes
Charaxes violetta
Charaxes xiphares
Charaxes zoolina
Euxanthe wakefieldi

Subfamily Limenitidinae

Cymothoe alcimeda
Cymothoe coranus
Euphaedra neophron
Euryphura achlys
Hamanumida daedalus
Neptis goochi
Neptis jordani
Neptis kiriakoffi
Neptis laeta
Neptis saclava
Neptis trigonophora
Pseudacraea boisduvali
Pseudacraea eurytus
Pseudacraea lucretia

Subfamily Cyrestinae
Cyrestis camillus

Subfamily Biblidinae
Byblia anvatara
Byblia ilithyia
Eurytela dryope
Eurytela hiarbas
Sevenia boisduvali
Sevenia morantii
Sevenia natalensis
Sevenia rosa

Subfamily Nymphalinae
Antanartia schaeneia
Catacroptera cloanthe
Hypolimnas anthedon
Hypolimnas deceptor
Hypolimnas misippus
Junonia hierta
Junonia natalica
Junonia oenone
Junonia orithya
Junonia terea
Junonia tugela
Precis antilope
Precis archesia
Precis ceryne
Precis octavia
Protogoniomorpha parhassus
Salamis anacardii
Vanessa cardui
Vanessa dimorphica
Vanessa hippomene

Subfamily Libytheinae
Libythea labdaca

Family Hesperiidae

Subfamily Coeliadinae
Coeliades anchises
Coeliades forestan
Coeliades keithloa
Coeliades libeon
Coeliades lorenzo
Coeliades pisistratus

Subfamily Pyrginae

Abantis bicolor
Abantis paradisea
Abantis tettensis
Abantis venosa
Alenia namaqua
Alenia sandaster
Astictopterus inornatus
Calleagris kobela
Calleagris krooni
Caprona pillaana
Celaenorrhinus mokeezi
Eagris nottoana
Eretis djaelaelae
Eretis umbra
Gomalia elma
Leucochitonea levubu
Metisella aegipan
Metisella malgacha
Metisella meninx
Metisella metis
Metisella syrinx
Metisella willemi
Netrobalane canopus
Sarangesa motozi
Sarangesa phidyle
Sarangesa ruona
Sarangesa seineri
Spialia agylla
Spialia asterodia
Spialia colotes
Spialia confusa
Spialia delagoae
Spialia depauperata
Spialia diomus
Spialia dromus
Spialia mafa
Spialia nanus
Spialia paula
Spialia sataspes
Spialia secessus
Spialia spio
Tagiades flesus
Tsitana dicksoni
Tsitana tsita
Tsitana tulbagha
Tsitana uitenhaga

Subfamily Hesperiinae

Acada biseriata
Acleros mackenii
Andronymus caesar
Andronymus neander
Artitropa erinnys
Borbo borbonica
Borbo detecta
Borbo fallax
Borbo fatuellus
Borbo ferruginea
Borbo gemella
Borbo holtzii
Borbo lugens
Borbo micans
Fresna nyassae
Gegenes hottentota
Gegenes niso
Gegenes pumilio
Kedestes barberae
Kedestes callicles
Kedestes chaca
Kedestes lenis
Kedestes lepenula
Kedestes macomo
Kedestes mohozutza
Kedestes nerva
Kedestes niveostriga
Kedestes sarahae
Kedestes wallengrenii
Moltena fiara
Parnara monasi
Parosmodes morantii
Pelopidas mathias
Pelopidas thrax
Platylesches ayresii
Platylesches dolomitica
Platylesches galesa
Platylesches moritili
Platylesches neba
Platylesches picanini
Platylesches robustus
Platylesches tina
Zenonia zeno
Zophopetes dysmephila

Family Lycaenidae

Subfamily Poritiinae

Alaena amazoula
Alaena margaritacea
Baliochila aslanga
Baliochila lipara
Cnodontes penningtoni
Deloneura immaculata
Deloneura millari
Durbania amakosa
Durbania limbata
Durbaniella clarki
Durbaniopsis saga
Ornipholidotos peucetia
Pentila tropicalis
Teriomima zuluana

Subfamily Miletinae
Aslauga australis
Lachnocnema bibulus
Lachnocnema durbani
Lachnocnema laches
Lachnocnema regularis

Thestor barbatus
Thestor basutus
Thestor brachycerus
Thestor braunsi
Thestor calviniae
Thestor camdeboo
Thestor claassensi
Thestor compassbergae
Thestor dicksoni
Thestor dryburghi
Thestor holmesi
Thestor kaplani
Thestor montanus
Thestor murrayi
Thestor overbergensis
Thestor penningtoni
Thestor petra
Thestor pictus
Thestor pringlei
Thestor protumnus
Thestor rileyi
Thestor rooibergensis
Thestor rossouwi
Thestor stepheni
Thestor strutti
Thestor vansoni
Thestor yildizae

Subfamily Aphnaeinae

Aloeides almeida
Aloeides apicalis
Aloeides aranda
Aloeides arida
Aloeides bamptoni
Aloeides barbarae
Aloeides barklyi
Aloeides braueri
Aloeides caffrariae
Aloeides caledoni
Aloeides carolynnae
Aloeides clarki
Aloeides damarensis
Aloeides dentatis
Aloeides depicta
Aloeides dicksoni
Aloeides dryas
Aloeides egerides
Aloeides gowani
Aloeides henningi
Aloeides juana
Aloeides kaplani
Aloeides lutescens
Aloeides macmasteri
Aloeides maluti
Aloeides margaretae
Aloeides mbuluensis
Aloeides merces
Aloeides molomo
Aloeides monticola
Aloeides nollothi
Aloeides nubilus
Aloeides oreas
Aloeides pallida
Aloeides penningtoni
Aloeides pierus
Aloeides pringlei
Aloeides quickelbergei
Aloeides rileyi
Aloeides rossouwi
Aloeides simplex
Aloeides stevensoni
Aloeides susanae
Aloeides swanepoeli
Aloeides taikosama
Aloeides thyra
Aloeides titei
Aloeides trimeni
Aloeides vansoni
Aphnaeus hutchinsonii
Argyraspodes argyraspis
Axiocerses amanga
Axiocerses coalescens
Axiocerses croesus

Axiocerses tjoane
Chloroselas mazoensis
Chloroselas pseudozeritis
Chrysoritis adonis
Chrysoritis aethon
Chrysoritis aridus
Chrysoritis aureus
Chrysoritis azurius
Chrysoritis beaufortius
Chrysoritis beulah
Chrysoritis blencathrae
Chrysoritis braueri
Chrysoritis brooksi
Chrysoritis chrysantas
Chrysoritis chrysaor
Chrysoritis daphne
Chrysoritis dicksoni
Chrysoritis endymion
Chrysoritis felthami
Chrysoritis irene
Chrysoritis lycegenes
Chrysoritis lyncurium
Chrysoritis midas
Chrysoritis natalensis
Chrysoritis nigricans
Chrysoritis oreas
Chrysoritis orientalis
Chrysoritis palmus
Chrysoritis pan
Chrysoritis pelion
Chrysoritis penningtoni
Chrysoritis perseus
Chrysoritis phosphor
Chrysoritis plutus
Chrysoritis pyramus
Chrysoritis pyroeis
Chrysoritis rileyi
Chrysoritis swanepoeli
Chrysoritis thysbe
Chrysoritis trimeni
Chrysoritis turneri
Chrysoritis uranus
Chrysoritis violescens
Chrysoritis zeuxo
Chrysoritis zonarius
Cigaritis ella
Cigaritis mozambica
Cigaritis namaquus
Cigaritis natalensis
Cigaritis phanes
Crudaria capensis
Crudaria leroma
Crudaria wykehami
(Erikssonia acraeina)
Erikssonia edgei

Phasis braueri
Phasis clavum
Phasis pringlei
Phasis thero
Trimenia argyroplaga
Trimenia macmasteri
Trimenia malagrida
Trimenia wallengrenii
Trimenia wykehami
Tylopaedia sardonyx

Subfamily Theclinae
Capys alphaeus
Capys disjunctus
Capys penningtoni
Deudorix antalus
Deudorix dariaves
Deudorix dinochares
Deudorix dinomenes
Deudorix diocles
Deudorix penningtoni
Deudorix vansoni
Hypolycaena buxtoni

Hypolycaena caeculus
Hypolycaena lochmophila
Hypolycaena philippus
Iolaus aemulus
Iolaus alienus
Iolaus aphnaeoides
Iolaus bowkeri
Iolaus diametra
Iolaus lulua
Iolaus mimosae
Iolaus nasisii
Iolaus pallene
Iolaus sidus
Iolaus silarus
Iolaus silas
Iolaus subinfuscata
Iolaus trimeni
Leptomyrina gorgias
Leptomyrina henningi
Leptomyrina hirundo
Leptomyrina lara
Myrina dermaptera
Myrina silenus

Subfamily Lycaeninae
Lycaena clarki
Lycaena orus

Subfamily Polyommatinae

Actizera lucida
Actizera stellata
Anthene amarah
Anthene butleri
Anthene contrastata
Anthene crawshayi
Anthene definita
Anthene juanitae
Anthene kersteni
Anthene lemnos
Anthene lindae
Anthene liodes
Anthene millari
Anthene minima
Anthene otacilia
Anthene princeps
Anthene talboti
Azanus jesous
Azanus mirza
Azanus moriqua
Azanus natalensis
Azanus ubaldus
Brephidium metophis
Cacyreus dicksoni
Cacyreus lingeus
Cacyreus marshalli
Cacyreus tespis
Cacyreus virilis
Cupidopsis cissus
Cupidopsis jobates
Eicochrysops hippocrates
Eicochrysops messapus
Euchrysops barkeri
Euchrysops dolorosa
Euchrysops malathana
Euchrysops osiris
Euchrysops subpallida
Freyeria trochylus
Harpendyreus noquasa
Harpendyreus notoba
Harpendyreus tsomo
Lampides boeticus
Lepidochrysops asteris
Lepidochrysops australis
Lepidochrysops bacchus
Lepidochrysops badhami
Lepidochrysops balli
Lepidochrysops braueri
Lepidochrysops dukei
Lepidochrysops glauca
Lepidochrysops grahami
Lepidochrysops gydoae
Lepidochrysops ignota
Lepidochrysops irvingi
Lepidochrysops jamesi
Lepidochrysops jefferyi
Lepidochrysops ketsi
Lepidochrysops lerothodi
Lepidochrysops letsea
Lepidochrysops littoralis
Lepidochrysops loewensteini
Lepidochrysops lotana
Lepidochrysops macgregori
Lepidochrysops methymna
Lepidochrysops oosthuizeni
Lepidochrysops oreas
Lepidochrysops ortygia
Lepidochrysops outeniqua
Lepidochrysops patricia
Lepidochrysops penningtoni
Lepidochrysops pephredo
Lepidochrysops plebeia
Lepidochrysops poseidon
Lepidochrysops praeterita
Lepidochrysops pringlei
Lepidochrysops procera
Lepidochrysops puncticilia
Lepidochrysops quickelbergei
Lepidochrysops robertsoni
Lepidochrysops rossouwi
Lepidochrysops southeyae
Lepidochrysops swanepoeli
Lepidochrysops swartbergensis
Lepidochrysops tantalus
Lepidochrysops titei
Lepidochrysops trimeni
Lepidochrysops vansoni
Lepidochrysops variabilis
Lepidochrysops victori
Lepidochrysops wykehami
Leptotes babaulti
Leptotes brevidentatus
Leptotes jeanneli
Leptotes pirithous
Leptotes pulchra
Orachrysops ariadne
Orachrysops brinkmani
Orachrysops lacrimosa
Orachrysops mijburghi
Orachrysops montanus
Orachrysops nasutus
Orachrysops niobe
Orachrysops regalis
Orachrysops subravus
Orachrysops violescens
Orachrysops warreni
Oraidium barberae
Pseudonacaduba sichela
Tarucus bowkeri
Tarucus sybaris
Tarucus thespis
Tuxentius calice
Tuxentius hesperis
Tuxentius melaena
Uranothauma nubifer
Zintha hintza
Zizeeria knysna
Zizina antanossa
Zizula hylax

Family Pieridae

Subfamily Pierinae

Appias epaphia
Appias sabina
Belenois aurota
Belenois creona
Belenois gidica
Belenois thysa
Belenois zochalia
Colotis agoye
Colotis amata
Colotis antevippe
Colotis auxo
Colotis celimene
Colotis danae
Colotis doubledayi
Colotis eris
Colotis erone
Colotis euippe
Colotis evagore
Colotis evenina
Colotis ione
Colotis lais
Colotis pallene
Colotis regina
Colotis subfasciatus
Colotis vesta
Dixeia charina
Dixeia doxo
Dixeia pigea
Dixeia spilleri
Eronia cleodora
Eronia leda
Leptosia alcesta
Mylothris agathina
Mylothris rueppellii
Mylothris trimenia
Nepheronia argia
Nepheronia buquetii
Nepheronia thalassina
Pieris brassicae
Pinacopteryx eriphia
Pontia helice

Subfamily Coliadinae
Catopsilia florella
Colias electo
Eurema brigitta
Eurema desjardinsii
Eurema hecabe

Family Papilionidae

Subfamily Papilioninae
Graphium angolanus
Graphium antheus
Graphium colonna
Graphium leonidas
Graphium morania
Graphium policenes
Graphium porthaon
Papilio constantinus
Papilio dardanus
Papilio demodocus
Papilio echerioides
Papilio euphranor
Papilio nireus
Papilio ophidicephalus

See also
List of moths of South Africa

References

Seitz, A. Die Gross-Schmetterlinge der Erde 13: Die Afrikanischen Tagfalter. Plates
Seitz, A. Die Gross-Schmetterlinge der Erde 13: Die Afrikanischen Tagfalter. Text 

 

South Africa
South Africa
Butterflies